Parliamentary elections were held in Morocco on 7 September 2007, the second of King Mohammed VI's reign. Voter turnout was estimated to be 37%, the lowest in Moroccan political history. There were 33 different parties and 13 independent candidates competing for 325 assembly seats. An amount of $61 million was allocated by the Moroccan government to organize the 2007 elections.

The number of constituencies was increased from 91 to 95 before this election. Interior minister Chakib Benmoussa claimed the changes were made "in accordance with objectivity and transparency." However, BBC correspondent Richard Hamilton accused the government of gerrymandering in order to prevent the Justice and Development Party from winning. 
 
According to many analysts the complex voting system makes it almost impossible for any group to win an outright majority, although others have disagreed with this view, arguing that the electoral system is not particularly unusual and should favor large parties.. Whatever the outcome, real power will remain with the king, who is executive head of state, military chief and religious leader.

For the first time in the history of elections in Morocco, they are being monitored by foreign observers including the U.S.'s National Democratic Institute for International Affairs and 42 others.

Turnout in the election was only 37% - the lowest in the history of Moroccan national elections. The Socialist Union of People's Forces (USFP), the largest party in the outgoing government lost nearly a quarter of its seats, and was replaced as the largest party by its coalition partner, the Istiqlal Party. The main gainers were the pro-government liberal People's Movement and Constitutional Union parties. The opposition Islamist Justice and Development Party had a modest increase in its tally as did the pro-government leftist Party of Progress and Socialism.

Following the election the USFP was expected to leave the governing coalition. Istiqlal Party leader Abbas El Fassi became PM on 19 September 2007.

Results

External links
 Official 2007 elections website 
 Political leaflets from the 2007 elections

References

2007 elections in Africa
Elections in Morocco
2007 in Morocco